Toshiki Takahashi may refer to:

Toshiki Takahashi, better known as Carlos Toshiki (born 1964), Brazilian singer-songwriter
, Japanese footballer